The Last Live may refer to:
 The Last Live (X Japan album)
 The Last Live (Princess Princess album)

See also
 The Last Live Video, a live DVD/VHS by X Japan